General Markham may refer to:

Edward Murphy Markham (1877–1950), U.S. Army major general
Edwin Markham (British Army officer) (1833–1918), British Army lieutenant general
Frederick Markham (1805–1855), British Army major general